Society for Environment and Education (SEE) was founded by Dr. P. Narayana Rao, who is the President of the SEE organization. The society was established to preserve the environment and prevent its degradation.

As a part of environmental education, Dr. Rao also created the magazine, 'Environment and People'. His grassroots efforts to protect environment in highly polluted cities like Hyderabad, Bangalore, Chennai and Mumbai in India are making a difference in the community.

The objectives of this society are:

- To inculcate environment awareness in society through social and cultural activities.

- To disseminate information through mass media and publications on status and utilization of environment.

- To conduct training programmes on environment education for students and youth.

- To initiate public interest litigation against environmental degradation.

- To encourage use of alternate and renewable sources of energy for clean environment.

- To develop awareness among women and children for promotion of their health, hygiene and healthy environment.

- To take up programmes for improving urban and rural environment to achieve better quality of life.

External links
Environment and People Magazine

See also
Solar power in India

Environmental organisations based in India
Environment of Karnataka